

Macau Peninsula
Land for cemeteries on mainland or peninsula were made available to the Europeans only.
 Old Protestant Cemetery
 Cemitério São Miguel Arcanjo – Saint Michael the Archangel Cemetery is the largest Catholic cemetery in Macau
 Cemitério Novo de Mong Há New Mong Há Cemetery
 Cemitério dos Parses Parsee Cemetery – established in 1822
 Macau Mosque and Cemetery (Mesquita e Cemiterio de Macau) – the only mosque and burial site of Macau's Muslim population
 Cemiterio De Nossa Senhora Da Piedade (Our Lady of Sorrows Cemetery) – Catholic Cemetery

Coloane and Taipa
The cemeteries on Coloane and Taipa were used by the Chinese of Macau. Some cemeteries have a view of sea, something desired by the Chinese.

Colonae
 Cemitério Hac Sa – small cemetery located on the southern end of Coloane
 Cemiterio Sun I – small cemetery on the southern end of Coloane
 Cemiterio Unido das Associacoes de Coloane – small cemetery located on the southern end of Coloane

Taipa
 Cemiterio Municipal da Taipa – cemetery located on Taipa across from Edifício do Lago.
 Cemiterio de Budista (United Chinese Cemetery) – one of the largest cemeteries in Macau and used by Macau's Chinese of Confucian, Taoist and Buddhist faiths; located on the northern foot of the Taipa Grande Hill.

Temples and Altars
For Chinese in Macau, the ashes of the deceased are not interred in cemeteries, but often placed in altars at various Buddhist temples throughout Macau.

References

Macau
 
Macau-related lists